The Buy American Act ("BAA", originally , now ) passed in 1933 by the Congress and signed by the President Hoover on his last full day in office (March 3, 1933), required the United States government to prefer U.S.-made products in its purchases. Other pieces of federal legislation extend similar requirements to third-party purchases that utilize federal funds, such as highway and transit programs.

The Buy American Act is not to be confused with the very similarly named "Buy America Act" that came into effect 50 years later. The latter, a provision of the Surface Transportation Assistance Act of 1982, is 49 U.S.C., § 5323 (j), and applies only to mass-transit-related procurements valued over US$100,000 and funded at least in part by federal grants.

In certain government procurements, the requirement purchase may be waived by the Contracting Officer or the Head of the Contracting Activity (HCA) if the domestic product is 25% or more expensive than an identical foreign-sourced product, if the product is not available domestically in sufficient quantity or quality, or if doing so is in the public's interest.

The President has the authority to waive the Buy American Act within the terms of a reciprocal agreement or otherwise in response to the provision of reciprocal treatment to U.S. producers. Under the 1979 General Agreement on Tariffs and Trade (GATT) Government Procurement Code, the U.S.–Israel Free Trade Agreement, the U.S.–Canada Free Trade Agreement, and the World Trade Organization (WTO) 1996 Agreement on Government Procurement (GPA), the United States provides access to the government procurement of certain U.S. agencies for goods from the other parties to those agreements. However, the Buy American Act was excluded from the GPA's coverage.

See also
Berry Amendment
Trade Agreements Act of 1979
Made in USA
American nationalism

References

1933 in law
72nd United States Congress
United States federal commerce legislation
United States federal trade legislation
Protectionism in the United States
American nationalism